Gurbaksh Singh Sandhu, also spelled as Gurbax/Gurbux Singh Sandhu, was the national boxing coach of India. He started coaching Indian National Team from the year 1993. He was influential in bringing a medal to India in 2008 Summer Olympics, when Vijender Singh of India won bronze, which was the first ever medal for India in Boxing at Olympics. He has also helped Indian boxers in their performances in World Championship. He stopped coaching boxing of India until July 2013.

Early life
Sandhu's association with the sport of boxing goes back to his childhood days at Sainik School, Jamnagar, where boxing was a compulsory discipline. 

He was a state champion but as he says, his inclination was more towards studies. However, destiny willed otherwise and after finishing school, Sandhu joined Government Sports College, Jalandhar, and later studied to acquire a diploma in boxing coaching from the NIS in 1975. He went to Germany to pursue Masters in Sports and on his return, joined NIS in 1977-78.

Two of his apprentice boxers reached the Quarter Finals of 2008 Summer Olympics, and Vijender Singh won a bronze medal. In 2012 Olympics, two boxers reached the quarter finals. He was also successful in making more boxers qualify for the Olympics. Eight Indian boxers had qualified for the London Olympics 2012.

Performance of boxers in Olympics

2008 Olympics

2012 Olympics

Men

References

External links 
 Indian contingent to the 2008 Beijing Olympics (PDF)
 Future of Indian Boxing is Bright: Gurbax Singh Sandhu

Indian Sikhs
Living people
Punjabi people
Sportspeople from Patiala
Sportspeople from Jalandhar
Sainik School alumni
Indian boxing coaches
Year of birth missing (living people)